Charles Isaac Sparks (December 20, 1872 – April 30, 1937) was a U.S. Representative from Kansas.

Born on a farm near Ontario, in Jackson Township, Iowa, Sparks was educated in the rural schools and Simpson College, Indianola, Iowa. He was graduated from the law department of the State University of Iowa at Iowa City in 1896. He was admitted to the bar the same year and commenced practice in Boone, Iowa. He served as prosecuting attorney of Boone County 1899-1902. He served as chairman of the Republican county committee in 1898. He moved to Goodland, Kansas, in 1907 and continued the practice of law. He served as city attorney and was a member of the Goodland School Board. He served as judge of the thirty-fourth judicial district of Kansas 1915-1929.

Sparks was elected as a Republican to the Seventy-first and Seventy-second Congresses (March 4, 1929 – March 3, 1933). He was one of the managers appointed by the House of Representatives in 1933 to conduct the impeachment proceedings against Harold Louderback, judge of the United States District Court for the Northern District of California. He was an unsuccessful candidate for reelection in 1932 to the Seventy-third Congress. He resumed the practice of law in Goodland, Kansas, until his death there on April 30, 1937. He was interred in the Goodland Cemetery.

References

External links

 

1872 births
1937 deaths
American prosecutors
Kansas state court judges
University of Iowa College of Law alumni
People from Boone, Iowa
Iowa Republicans
Iowa lawyers
Kansas lawyers
Republican Party members of the United States House of Representatives from Kansas
Simpson College alumni
School board members in Kansas
People from Goodland, Kansas